Albacete is a Spanish surname. Notable people with the surname include:

Antonio Albacete (born 1965), Spanish racing driver
Lorenzo Albacete (1941–2014), American Roman Catholic priest and theologian
Patricio Albacete (born 1981), Argentine rugby union player

Spanish-language surnames